Felicia gunillae is a species of flowering plant in the family Asteraceae. It is endemic to Namibia, where it is known only from Dâures Constituency.

References

gunillae
Endemic flora of Namibia
Taxonomy articles created by Polbot